Kyriakos Stratilatis (born 5 January 1988) is a Greek professional footballer who plays as a goalkeeper for Cypriot club Ethnikos Achna.

He has played also for Greece U21.

International career
He was a starter in four games of the Greek team that reached the final during the 2007 UEFA European Under-19 Football Championship.

References
 Guardian Football

External links
Profile at Onsports.gr

1988 births
Living people
Greek footballers
Association football goalkeepers
Aris Thessaloniki F.C. players
Levadiakos F.C. players
A.O. Kerkyra players
AEL Kalloni F.C. players
Alki Oroklini players
Super League Greece players
Football League (Greece) players
Cypriot Second Division players
Cypriot First Division players
Expatriate footballers in Cyprus
Greek expatriate footballers
Greek expatriates in Cyprus
Footballers from Kavala